"Shape of My Heart" is a song by American boy band Backstreet Boys, released on October 2, 2000, as the lead single from their fourth studio album, Black & Blue (2000). The ballad was written and produced by Max Martin and Rami, and co-written by Lisa Miskovsky.

The song earned a Grammy Award nomination during the 44th Grammy Awards for Best Pop Performance by a Duo or Group with Vocals.

Background
Due to the success of rival boy band NSYNC's album No Strings Attached selling over 2.4 million copies in its first week, there were high expectations from industry experts and fans that the Backstreet Boys' next album Black & Blue would break the first week sales of No Strings Attached. "Shape of My Heart" was widely anticipated as the lead single of Black & Blue, which would follow their previous singles "Quit Playing Games (With My Heart)", "Everybody (Backstreet's Back)", and "I Want It That Way".

Composition
"Shape of My Heart" is stated to be "the sound of a boy band becoming a group of men". It consists of a bubblegum chorus, clean pop structure, along with various vocal harmonies from Max Martin's production. It also contains soft-pop guitar, low-key percussion, and a lyrical emphasis on the reflection of past mistakes.

The song is performed in D major with a key change to E major at the third chorus.

Critical reception
Craig Seymour of Entertainment Weekly gave the song a C- in his review, stating that the "mid-tempo ballad is more a joyless retread than a maturing makeover". Jason Lipshutz of Billboard considered the song to be a disappointment, stating that it was a muted mid-tempo reflection on mistakes and weaknesses, as well as being "miscast as a flashy comeback that would return serve against *NSYNC and hijack pop radio for months".

Chart performance
The song debuted at number 9 on the Billboard Hot 100 in the United States, giving the group their sixth and last top-10 single in the US, while reaching number 8 on the Billboard Mainstream Top 40 chart. It also topped the charts in Canada, Italy, the Netherlands, New Zealand, Norway, and Switzerland as well as the top 10 in several other countries.

Music video

Background
The music video for "Shape of My Heart" was directed by Matthew Rolston  at the Orpheum Theatre in Los Angeles. The entire video is shot in monochrome with a blue tint, creating a black and blue atmosphere in reference to the album's name. Rolston was inspired by "classic photography", utilizing the blue tint to evoke earlier periods of photography, as well as showcasing a mature side of the band in place of their previous over-the-top videos. On MTV's Total Request Live the music video broke the Backstreet Boys' own record for longest-running number-one song, which was previously held by "Larger Than Life" (1999). The video spent 61 days at the top position. As of September 2021, the music video has over 222 million views on YouTube.

Synopsis
The video shows the Backstreet Boys rehearsing lines for a production titled Shape of My Heart, printed on a script around an empty theater in places such as the backstage wall, and on the stage. The actress Sara Foster and the actor Ryan McTavish rehearse on the stage while another couple watches from a desk in front of the audience. Each of the people introduced are also featured alongside the Backstreet Boys as they rehearse.

Legacy
The song was the last single by the Backstreet Boys to peak in the top-ten of the Billboard Hot 100 chart, as they outgrew their teenage years. Jason Lipshutz stated that the song's influence spread to future Backstreet Boys singles such as "Incomplete", "Show 'Em (What You're Made Of)", and "Don't Go Breaking My Heart", concluding that although it wasn't a smash, it has become "an important inflection point for one of the era’s biggest groups".

Cover versions
In 2008, one of the song's writers, Lisa Miskovsky, released her own version of the song, "Another Shape of My Heart" on her 2008 album Last Year's Songs: Greatest Hits.

Track listings
Standard CD single, UK cassette single
 "Shape of My Heart" – 3:47
 "All I Have to Give" (a cappella) – 3:48
 "The One" (Jack D. Elliot Radio Mix) – 3:46

European CD single
 "Shape of My Heart" – 3:47
 "All I Have to Give" (a cappella) – 3:48

Credits and personnel
Credits are taken from the European CD single liner notes.

Recording
 Recorded and mixed at Cheiron Studios, Stockholm, Sweden. Vocals recorded at Polar Studios, Stockholm, Sweden.

Personnel
 Max Martin – songwriter, producer, recording, mixing, guitar
 Rami Yacoub – songwriter, producer, recording, mixing
 Lisa Miskovsky – songwriter
 Stefan Boman – vocal recording engineer
 Esbjörn Öhrwall – guitar
 Peter Svensson – guitar
 Tomas Lindberg – bass
 John Amatiello – Pro Tools and XBS Optical Vocal Enhancer engineer
 Tom Coyne – mastering

Charts

Weekly charts

Year-end charts

Certifications

Release history

Notes

References

2000 singles
2000 songs
2000s ballads
Backstreet Boys songs
Canadian Singles Chart number-one singles
European Hot 100 Singles number-one singles
Jive Records singles
Music videos directed by Matthew Rolston
Number-one singles in Italy
Number-one singles in New Zealand
Number-one singles in Norway
Number-one singles in Sweden
Pop ballads
Song recordings produced by Max Martin
Song recordings produced by Rami Yacoub
Songs about loneliness
Songs written by Max Martin
Songs written by Rami Yacoub
Torch songs
UK Independent Singles Chart number-one singles